West Fifth Avenue Apartments Historic District is a national historic district located at Gary, Indiana.  The district encompasses 30 contributing buildings in a residential section of Gary. The buildings were built between 1922 and 1928, and consist of a dense group of brick apartment blocks mostly four stories tall. Architectural styles include examples of Colonial Revival, Renaissance Revival, Late Gothic Revival, and Commercial style architecture.

It was listed in the National Register of Historic Places in 1984.

References

Historic districts on the National Register of Historic Places in Indiana
Colonial Revival architecture in Indiana
Gothic Revival architecture in Indiana
Renaissance Revival architecture in Indiana
Historic districts in Gary, Indiana
National Register of Historic Places in Gary, Indiana